The Last Confession of Alexander Pearce is a 2008 Australian-Irish film directed by Michael James Rowland starring Irish actors Adrian Dunbar as Philip Conolly and Ciarán McMenamin as bushranger Alexander Pearce and an ensemble Australian cast, including Dan Wyllie, Don Hany and Chris Haywood. The film was shot on location in Tasmania and Sydney between April and May 2008.

The film was nominated for the 2010 Rose d'Or, Best Drama at the 6th Annual Irish Film and Television Awards, Best Drama at the 2009 Australian Film Institute Awards, won Best Documentary at the 2009 Inside Film Awards and the director Michael James Rowland was nominated in the Best Director (Telemovie) category in the 2009 Australian Directors Guild Awards.

Premise and title
The film follows the final days of Irish convict and bushranger Alexander Pearce's life as he awaits execution. In 1824 the British penal colony of Van Diemen's Land is little more than a living hell. Chained to a wall in the darkness of a cell under Hobart Gaol, Pearce is visited by Father Philip Conolly, the parish priest of the fledgling colony and a fellow Irishman. Pearce wishes to tell the priest his recollection of the horrors he endured in the three months spent traversing the brutal wilderness of Van Diemen's Land. Conolly struggles to reconcile his desire to grant absolution to the convict with the story Pearce tells him. The title of the film comes from the remarkable interaction between Philip Conolly and Alexander Pearce days before Pearce is executed. The Last Confession of Alexander Pearce is presented as a psychoanalytical historical epic.

The relatively underscored aspect of Pearce's crime and confessions is the murder of fellow escapees and the alleged cannibalism.

The film details the convict's relinquishing psyche as he finds himself succumbing to the inevitability of his imminent execution. For much of the film, the complex relationship between Pearce and Conolly is examined. The circumstances and motives of Pearce's execution are, too, put into question by Rowland.

Production
Producer and co-writer Nial Fulton began developing The Last Confession of Alexander Pearce in Ireland in 1998 and production began on the project in Australia in the summer of 2006. The film was commissioned and financed by the Australian Broadcasting Corporation, RTÉ, BBC Northern Ireland, Screen Australia and Screen Tasmania.

The Last Confession of Alexander Pearce was inspired by the true story of an escape from the infamous Sarah Island penal settlement in Macquarie Harbour, Van Diemen's Land in 1822 by Irish convict and bushranger Alexander Pearce and the subsequent confession he made to the Hobart priest Phillip Conolly days before he was executed for the murder of fellow convict Thomas Cox.

Script
Written by Michael James Rowland and Nial Fulton, the script draws on all four confessions made by Alexander Pearce, but principally on the confessions he made to Commandant John Cuthbertson and the final confession made to the priest Phillip Conolly. In many places the script uses the exact words written down in these confessions.

Principal cast
Adrian Dunbar as Philip Connolly
Ciarán McMenamin as Alexander Pearce
Dan Wyllie as Robert Greenhill
Don Hany as John Mather
Bob Franklin as Matthew Travers
Chris Haywood as Reverend Robert Knopwood

Van Diemen's Land / Tasmania
Shot over five weeks on location in Tasmania and Sydney in 2008, the film used locations around Derwent Bridge, Lake St Clair, Nelson Falls, the Huon Valley, Mount Wellington and Callan Park, a former asylum in Rozelle. Many of the filming locations were selected as they were places Alexander Pearce may have passed through on his escape from Sarah Island.

Critical response and reviews
The Last Confession of Alexander Pearce received positive reviews internationally from film critics.

The Age
The Australian
Sydney Morning Herald
Jackson Free Press
The Independent
Filmink
BBC
Inside Film Magazine
Belfast Telegraph
Sunday Mirror
Tasmanian Examiner
The Northern Star

Empire Magazine, The Sunday Times and The Sydney Morning Herald all gave the film 4/5 stars.

Awards

Key awards and nominations

See also
 Cinema of Australia
 Macquarie Harbour Penal Station
 Van Diemen's Land
 Tasmanian Gothic
 Alexander Pearce
 County Monaghan

References

External links
 
 
 Screen Tasmania
 Hopscotch Films
 Horrorphile

2008 films
2000s historical films
APRA Award winners
Australian historical films
Films about cannibalism
Convictism in Australia
Films set in colonial Australia
Films set in Tasmania
Films set in 1824
History of Tasmania
Incidents of cannibalism
Films scored by Roger Mason (musician)
2000s English-language films